Horácio de Matos (March 18, 1882 – May 15, 1931) was a Brazilian politician and colonel.

References

Brazilian politicians
1882 births
1931 deaths
20th-century Brazilian military personnel